Ira J. Deen (December 9, 1874 – June 7, 1952) was an American artist.

Born in Mount Union, Pennsylvania, Deen moved with his family to Harrisburg in 1891 when he was 16 where he took a job painting city electric trolley cars for the Harrisburg Traction Co.  Deen was known for his impressionist nature and landscape paintings  of the Susquehanna River and other areas of Pennsylvania countryside.

References

1874 births
20th-century American painters
American male painters
American Impressionist painters
Landscape artists
Painters from Pennsylvania
1952 deaths
20th-century American male artists